Actaeon beetle (Megasoma actaeon) is a rhinoceros beetle of the family Scarabaeidae.

Etymology
The species name actaeon derives from the name Actaeon of a famous Theban hero, son of the priestly herdsman Aristaeus and Autonoe in Boeotia, trained by the centaur Chiron.

Description
The males can grow to be 13 cm (5.4 in) long by 4 cm (1.6 in) thick .

The dorsal surfaces are glabrous (bald), matte or shiny black. The legs are powerful, with large tarsal claws. Males have appendages resembling horns on the pronotum and on the head. The two parallel horns on the pronotum are short, acute and forward pointing, while a much longer horn with a small tooth is present on the head. In the females the pronotum and the elytra  are rugose and the horns are missing.

Life cycle
Females lay eggs into soil at eclosion and eggs develop in about  9 months. Larval development and pupation takes in total almost 3 years. Larvae at the 3rd instar can reach the weight of 200 grams, the highest weight among insects. Life expectancy of adults in captivity reaches about 100–150 days. The heaviest Actaeon ever recorded was found in the northern regions of South America weighed 228 grams (8.04 oz) in 2009 nearly equivalent to a female rat. This not only makes it the heaviest beetle but the heaviest insect of any kind.

Distribution
This species can be found in South America, particularly in Bolivia, Brazil, Colombia, Ecuador, México, French Guiana, Guyana, Panama, Peru, Suriname, and Venezuela.

See also 

 List of largest insects

References 

 Photos Elephant beetle Megasoma actaeon 
 Natural World
 Breeding Megasoma actaeon

External links

 Insecta Culture

Dynastinae
Beetles of South America
Arthropods of Colombia
Beetles described in 1758
Taxa named by Carl Linnaeus